Mary Russell may refer to:
 Mary Russell, Duchess of Bedford (1865–1937), English pilot and ornithologist
 Mary Doria Russell (born 1950), American author
 Mary Rhodes Russell (born 1958), American judge
 Mary Jane Russell (1926–2003), American photographic fashion model
 Mary Baptist Russell (1829–1898), religious sister, nurse, philanthropist, and educator
 Mary Russell (character) (active since 1994), a fictional character in works by Laurie R. King
 Mary Russell (ship), built in 1817
 Mary Russell (actress) (1912–2005), American actress
 Ann Russell Miller (born Mary Ann Russell, 1928–2021), American socialite and nun

See also
 Mary Russell Mitford (1787–1855), English author